Robert Banks may refer to:

 Robert Banks (American football) (born 1963), former American football defensive end
 Robert Banks (chemist) (1921–1989), co-inventor of high-density polyethylene
 Robert Banks (filmmaker) (born 1966), American experimental filmmaker from Cleveland
 Robert Banks (musician) (born 1930), pianist, organist and composer
 Robert Banks (optician) (19th century), English maker of optical instruments
 Robert Banks (politician) (born 1937), Conservative MP for Harrogate before 1992
 Robert J. Banks (theologian) (born 1939), Australian theologian
 Robert Joseph Banks (born 1928), retired bishop of the Roman Catholic Diocese of Green Bay
 Robert Richardson Banks (1812–1872), English architect
 Robert T. Banks (1822–1901), American politician
 Bob Banks (born 1930), Australian rugby league player

See also
 Robert Banks Stewart (1931–2016), Scottish television scriptwriter
 Roberts Bank, an undersea bank near Vancouver, British Columbia